Coedpenmaen (Coed-Pen-Maen) is a subdistrict of the Pontypridd town district and ward of Trallwng (Trallwn), Rhondda Cynon Taf, South Wales.  It also comprises Pontypridd Common or as it is sometimes referred to 'Coedpenmaen Common'.  The boundaries between the residential areas of Coedpenmaen and Trallwn themselves are blurred.  Just beyond the Common on the way to the adjoining village of Glyntaff is the aptly named small village of Pentrebach (literally Welsh for 'small village').

References

External links
http://www.francisfrith.com/coedpenmaen/
http://www.geograph.org.uk/gridref/ST0890?inner
http://www.coedpenmaenbaptist.co.uk/
http://www.genuki.org.uk/big/wal/GLA/Eglwysilan/Coedpenmaen/
https://web.archive.org/web/20111003130404/http://archive.rhondda-cynon-taf.gov.uk/treorchy/index.php?a=wordsearch&s=gallery&w=coedpenmaen
https://web.archive.org/web/20111003130421/http://archive.rhondda-cynon-taf.gov.uk/treorchy/index.php?a=wordsearch&s=gallery&w=pentrebach
https://web.archive.org/web/20111003130431/http://archive.rhondda-cynon-taf.gov.uk/treorchy/index.php?a=wordsearch&s=gallery&w=pontypridd+common

Villages in Rhondda Cynon Taf